Loyal K. Park (born 1933) is a former American football, basketball, and baseball player and coach and college athletics administrator. He served as the head men's basketball and football coach at Edinboro University (then-known as Edinboro State College) from 1960 to 1962. After serving for a time as an assistant football coach at Boston College in Chestnut Hill, Massachusetts, he served as the head baseball coach at Harvard University from 1969 to 1978.

References

External links

1933 births
Living people
Boston College Eagles football coaches
Edinboro Fighting Scots football coaches
Edinboro Fighting Scots football players
Edinboro Fighting Scots men's basketball coaches
Fitzgerald Pioneers players
Frostburg State Bobcats athletic directors
Harvard Crimson baseball coaches
Harvard Crimson football coaches
Loyola Ramblers athletic directors
Salem Tigers athletic directors
College men's track and field athletes in the United States
High school basketball coaches in the United States
High school football coaches in Pennsylvania